William Henry Mercer (27 May 1888 – 5 June 1956) was an English professional footballer who played as a goalkeeper in the Football League for Hull City, Huddersfield Town and Blackpool. An all-round sportsman, he notably played for Hull Cricket Club and was a prominent snooker player in Yorkshire.

Personal life 
Mercer's brother Peter was 1947 National Bowls champion. Mercer served in the Royal Engineers during the First World War and was demobilised in December 1919. Mercer operated a billiard hall in west Hull during the 1930s and 1940s, but by 1948, he was suffering health issues due to mustard gas poisoning he had suffered in 1917, during the course of his war service. Mercer moved to live with his brother Peter in Worthing and died there of a heart complaint in 1956.

Career statistics

Honours 
Huddersfield Town

 Football League First Division (2): 1924–25, 1925–26

References

English footballers
1888 births
1956 deaths
Sportspeople from Prescot
Association football goalkeepers
English Football League players
Hull City A.F.C. players
Huddersfield Town A.F.C. players
Blackpool F.C. players
FA Cup Final players

Royal Engineers soldiers
British Army personnel of World War I